Simply Slang is an American hard rock quartet, founded in 2002, and based in Chicago, Illinois, United States. Originally known as Deadline, the band later changed its name upon discovering another band using the same name. In 2004, Simply Slang issued its eponymous debut, Simply Slang, through Platinum Realm Entertainment.

Within a short time of its release, Simply Slang began to receive international attention, due in part by the band offering free downloads of its songs through the internet.

This strategy proved effective, as two songs released from the debut, "Live 4 The Weekend" and "Angeline", became top downloads on music websites around the world. In March 2005, Simply Slang reached No. 1 on the Heavy Rock Artist chart on MP3.com.au, Australia's most popular music provider. Several weeks later (on the same website) Simply Slang hit No. 1 on the Heavy Rock Album chart.

Despite the accomplishments, the band's lack of financial success started to take a toll. The hectic tour schedules, along with artistic conflicts, substance abuse issues, and financial woes, grew too much for some members to bear. Starting with guitarist Jeff Novak, the musicians departed one by one. By August 2005, frontman Aaron Morales was the band's sole remaining original member. In the weeks to follow, Simply Slang would go through several lineup changes before entering the studio in late 2005, to begin work on their second opus, Bad Attitude.

Released on June 23, 2006, Bad Attitude featured the new lineup, along with a fresh, new, aggressive style. With material ranging from punky rock anthems, to blues-metal sleaze, Bad Attitude allowed the members of Simply Slang to forge a new chapter in the band's existence.

Simply Slang maintains a cult following among hard rock and sleaze/glam metal fans in the United Kingdom, Australia, Scandinavia, Latin America, Spain, and Italy. Despite the band's achievements internationally, Simply Slang did not achieve notable success in the United States.

In 2007, Aaron Morales dissolved the band to pursue his solo career, contributing to Hollywood's Demon Doll Records compilation album, Glamnation Vol. 2, and later releasing an EP called "Independence!" in 2010. Former members Patrick Mulcahy and Jon Schang are currently in progressive rock band District 97, with American Idol Season 6 semi-finalist Leslie Hunt.

Members
Aaron Morales - Guitar, Vocals (2002–2007)
Matt Overbee - Guitar (2005–2007)
Pat Mulcahy - Bass (2006–2007)
Jon Schang - Drums (2005–2007)

Discography
Simply Slang (2004)
Bad Attitude (2006)

External links
Official Website
Official MySpace Page
Heavy Harmonies page

2002 establishments in Illinois
2007 disestablishments in Illinois
Glam metal musical groups from Illinois
Hard rock musical groups from Illinois
Musical groups established in 2002
Musical groups disestablished in 2007